Robert Lentz  (born 1946), is an American Franciscan friar and religious icon painter. He is particularly known for incorporating contemporary social themes into his icon work. He belongs to the Order of Friars Minor, and is currently stationed in Holy Name Province.

Life
Lentz was born in rural Colorado to a family of Russian descent and of a Russian Orthodox background.  Lentz originally intended to enter the Franciscan Order as a young man in the 1960s, joining the formation program for St. John the Baptist Province, but left before taking his vows. Afterward, he was inspired by his family's Eastern Christian heritage and became interested in icon painting. He took up formal study in 1977 as an apprentice painter to a master of Greek icon painting from the school of Photios Kontoglou at Holy Transfiguration Monastery in Brookline, Massachusetts.

During his time in the Secular Franciscan community in New Mexico, Lentz developed a close relationship to the local friars, and again felt the call to join the order. He was received into the Order of Friars Minor in New Mexico in 2003, and transferred to the Holy Name Province on the East Coast in 2008. After relocating he taught at St. Bonaventure University. He is currently stationed at Holy Name College in Silver Spring, Maryland.

Lentz is gay. In New Mexico, Lentz taught William Hart McNichols, another gay Christian iconographer.

Work
Lentz's icons include fourteen large images of recently canonized saints, people of various cultures and ethnicities, and modern secular political and cultural figures. Toby Johnson calls Lentz's icon of Harvey Milk "a national gay treasure". His 1994 icon of Sergius and Bacchus was first displayed at Chicago's Gay Pride Parade, and has become a popular symbol in the gay Christian community. Addison H. Hart of Touchstone criticized Lentz' works for breaking with the traditional purpose of Christian icons, writing that they "do not serve as vehicles of the tradition, but as propaganda and individual expression".

Notes

Bibliography
A Passion for Life: Fragments of the Face of God, by Joan D. Chittister and Robert Lentz, 1996, Orbis Books, 132 pages, 
Christ in the Margins, by Robert Lentz and Edwina Gately, 2003, Orbis Books, 144 pages,

External links

1946 births
Painters from Colorado
American people of Russian descent
Living people
20th-century American painters
American male painters
21st-century American painters
21st-century male artists
Secular Franciscans
American gay artists
LGBT Roman Catholics
American Friars Minor
Roman Catholic religious brothers
St. Bonaventure University faculty
LGBT people from Colorado
Converts to Roman Catholicism from Eastern Orthodoxy